Martin Redmond (15 August 1937 – 16 January 1997) was a British Labour Party politician from Doncaster in South Yorkshire.

Martin Redmond was of Irish descent and was born in Scawsby, near Doncaster. He was educated at Woodlands Roman Catholic School and then by day release at the University of Sheffield. He worked as a driver of heavy goods vehicles, and was elected to Doncaster Borough Council in 1975. He became leader of the council in 1982, and was elected at the 1983 general election as the Member of Parliament (MP) for Don Valley, sponsored by the National Union of Mineworkers. He made his maiden speech in the House of Commons in a debate on housing on 5 July 1983, and spoke frequently in the Commons on the miners strike.
      
He was a leading member of the All-Party Parliamentary Groups for interest in Thailand, Bahrain, Malta and ASEAN.

He was re-elected in 1987 and 1992, but died in office in January 1997 from undisclosed causes. No by-election was held, and his seat remained vacant when Parliament was dissolved in April for the general election in May 1997. The seat was won by Caroline Flint of the Labour Party.

References

External links 
Redmond's maiden speech in the House of Commons: 
 

1937 births
1997 deaths
Labour Party (UK) MPs for English constituencies
National Union of Mineworkers-sponsored MPs
UK MPs 1983–1987
UK MPs 1987–1992
UK MPs 1992–1997
Councillors in South Yorkshire
Labour Party (UK) councillors
Alumni of the University of Sheffield
Leaders of local authorities of England